Joo Yeon Sir (born June 29, 1990, in Seoul), is a South Korean-born British violinist and composer.

Educated at the Purcell School and at the Royal College of Music, London where she studied with Dr. Felix Andrievsky as a scholar, Joo Yeon Sir has been a major prizewinner at national and international competitions in the UK and abroad and has performed as recitalist, chamber musician, and soloist with orchestras at various venues including the Royal Albert Hall, Royal Festival Hall, Wales Millennium Centre, Barbican Hall, Wigmore Hall, Liverpool Symphony Hall, London Arts Club, Fairfield Halls, the Foundling Museum, and St James's Palace in the presence of Prince Charles. She has appeared as soloist with the Royal Philharmonic, Philharmonia, and Bournemouth Symphony orchestras as well as with her regular recital partners Irina Andrievsky (piano) and Laura Snowdon (guitar). Her recordings have been regularly featured on the BBC, Classic FM, Scala, RTÉ, and France Musique radio stations.

Joo Yeon Sir has received recognition as a violinist. In 2006, at the age of sixteen, Sir became the Overall Grand Prix Laureate at Nedyalka Simeonova International Violin Competition in Haskovo, Bulgaria, where her gala performance was broadcast on Radio Bulgaria (BNR). Sir is also recipient of Royal Philharmonic Society's Emily Anderson Prize 2007, MBF Music Education Award 2008, and the Second Prize at Windsor Festival International String Competition 2008, as the youngest finalist. In 2014, Sir was awarded the Royal College of Music's President's Award and the prestigious The Arts Club Karl Jenkins Classical Music Award.

As a composer, Joo Yeon Sir has won the First Prize and the title of BBC/The Guardian Young Composer of the Year 2005 at the age of fourteen for her composition Conflict in Time, which has been performed at Wigmore Hall, Cadogan Hall by Endymion and has been broadcast on BBC Radio 3. Her projects have been performed at the "Birtwistle Games" Festival at the South Bank Centre and her work, "Cold Dark Matter - an exploded view" for orchestra, inspired by British sculptor Cornelia Parker, was premiered at the Queen Elizabeth Hall, South Bank Centre in February 2007. In 2018, she was commissioned to write a work for solo violin, My Dear Bessie, based on the love letters of Chris Barker and Bessie Moore during the Second World War. Sir has also collaborated with contemporary composers, notably Sir Karl Jenkins, who composed Chatterbox! and Lament for the Valley especially for her.

Discography 

Sources:

References

External links

1990 births
Alumni of the Royal College of Music
Living people
South Korean violinists
South Korean expatriates in the United Kingdom
21st-century violinists